Let's Get This Party Started may refer to:

Television
A 2008 episode of the show The L Word
A 2007 episode of the show The Salt-N-Pepa Show
"Let's get this party started!", catchphrase from Coyote Ragtime Show

Music
"Let's Get This Party Started", a song by 2face Idibia, Wizkid, D'banj, Tiwa Savage and M.I
"Let's Get This Party Started", a song by Azuré & Snoop Dogg from Snoop Dogg Presents The Big Squeeze
"Let's Get This Party Started", a song by Dee Dee Sharp
"Let's Get This Party Started", a song by Funk Machine from Renaissance: The Mix Collection
"Let's Get This Party Started", a song by Korn from Issues
"Let's Get This Party Started", a song by Macy Gray performed at the Live Earth concert, Rio de Janeiro
"Let's Get This Party Started", a song by Robbie Rivera
"Let's Get This Party Started", a song by Roma!
"Let's Get This Party Started", a song by Take 5 from the film Longshot
"Let's Get This Party Started", a song by Zena McNally